Colchicum variegatum, common name Κολχικό το ποικιλόμορφο or Güz Acıçiğdemi, Sürincan is a plant species native to Greece and Turkey but cultivated in many other places.

Colchicum variegatum is a perennial herb forming an underground corm. Tepals are broadly lanceolate, white, mottled with numerous brown or purple markings, sometimes taking the form of spots, other times forming a checkerboard or chessboard pattern.

References

External links

Greek Mountain Flora, photo of Colchicum variegatum at Mount Ochi on Evia Island
Pacific Bulb Society, Colchicum variegatum

variegatum
Medicinal plants of Europe
Plants described in 1753
Taxa named by Carl Linnaeus
Flora of Turkey
Flora of Greece